Three Colours: Red is a 1994 romantic mystery film co-written, produced and directed by Polish filmmaker Krzysztof Kieślowski. It is the final installment of the Three Colours trilogy, which examines the French Revolutionary ideals; it is preceded by Blue and White. Kieślowski had announced that this would be his final film, which proved true with the director's sudden death in 1996. Red is about fraternity, which it examines by showing characters whose lives gradually become closely interconnected, with bonds forming between two characters who appear to have little in common.

Red was released to universal critical acclaim and was nominated for three Academy Awards, including Best Director for Kieślowski. It was also selected as the Swiss entry for the Best Foreign Language Film at the 67th Academy Awards, but was disqualified for not being a majority-Swiss production.

As of 2022, it is one of only two films to receive perfect ratings on both Rotten Tomatoes and Metacritic, along with Fanny and Alexander.

Plot
Valentine Dussaut is a University of Geneva student who works part-time as a model. She often contacts her possessive boyfriend, who is currently overseas, and is planning to meet him in London. In one of her modeling assignments, she poses for a chewing-gum advertising campaign, and a photograph of her displaying sad emotions is chosen.

Auguste, a law student neighbor of Valentine, finds a relevant chapter in the Criminal Code when his textbooks fall open while he walks home. After a modeling job, Valentine hits a pregnant Malinois dog named Rita while driving home. She tracks down the dog's owner, retired judge Joseph Kern, but he shows no concern, so Valentine takes the dog to a veterinarian and decides to keep her. She selects her favorite photo at the photographer's studio, rebuffing sexual advances from the ad company's photographer. Money later is delivered to Valentine's apartment from an unknown sender.

The next day, Valentine takes Rita for a walk, and the dog leads her back to Kern's house. Kern confirms that he sent the money for the vet expenses and tells Valentine to keep the dog. As he gave her extra money, she returns it to him. While waiting for Kern, Valentine goes inside his house and catches him eavesdropping on a male neighbor's phone conversation with his male lover. She tries to convince Kern to respect his neighbor's privacy, but he challenges her to reveal the eavesdropping to the neighbor. When she does, she discovers the neighbor's daughter listening on the phone extension. Kern reveals that he's a judge, and his actions won't change the outcome of people's lives. Valentine shares that her brother's biological father isn't her dad. Kern also suspects a neighbor of drug trafficking and shows her Auguste, a law student who passes his exam to become a judge, crediting his success to the dropped textbook.

That night, Kern writes letters confessing his spying activities, resulting in a class-action lawsuit. At court, Kern sees Karin flirting and admits to confessing due to Valentine's disgust. They discuss altruism, and Kern recounts a case where he wrongly acquitted a sailor. Valentine asks if Kern has ever loved, but he evades the question and talks about a dream where she was happy. A neighbor throws a stone and breaks the window during their conversation, and Kern replaces a light bulb.

Auguste can't reach Karin by phone, so he climbs up to her flat and catches her having sex with another man. He takes his anger out on his dog and leaves it at a lamppost. Kern calls Karin's "Personal Weather Service" to inquire about the weather for the English Channel, which she predicts will be clear. Karin plans to sail there soon with her new boyfriend, who owns a yacht.

Before leaving for England, Valentine invites Kern to her fashion show. As they have coffee at the theater, Kern senses that the gathering storm will soon put Valentine in danger. Their conversation turns to Kern's doomed love life, which echoes Auguste's recent experiences of infidelity and a dropped textbook. Kern reveals that the girl he loved died in an accident after he followed her across the English Channel and that his last case as a judge involved his ex-girlfriend's lover. By coincidence, Auguste's first case as a judge is Kern's trial. Kern shares more details of his dream with Valentine, in which she is 50 and happy with a man she loves. Before parting ways, Kern and Valentine plan to meet again in three weeks when he will give her one of Rita's puppies.

Finally, Valentine boards the ferry to England. Auguste also boards the ferry, reunited with his dog. While searching for their seats, they come in close proximity to each other as they ask a ferry employee for directions. Meanwhile, Kern tends to the puppies and learns that a storm has hit the English Channel, causing both the ferry and the yacht to sink. Watching the television coverage of the incident, it is revealed that only seven survivors are pulled from the ferry, including a barman, Julie and Olivier from Blue, Karol and Dominique from White, Auguste (without his dog), and Valentine. Upon seeing the news, Kern is relieved and looks out of his broken window. The final image is a freeze-frame of Valentine during the rescue of ferry passengers, which closely resembles the ad poster but shows genuine emotion on her face.

Cast
 Irène Jacob as Valentine Dussaut
 Jean-Louis Trintignant as Joseph Kern
 Jean-Pierre Lorit as Auguste Bruner
 Frederique Feder as Karin
 Samuel Le Bihan as Le photographe (photographer)
 Marion Stalens as Le vétérinaire (Veterinary surgeon)
 Teco Celio as Le barman (barman)
 Bernard Escalon as Le disquaire (record dealer)
 Jean Schlegel as Le voisin (neighbour)
 Roland Carey as Le trafiquant (drug dealer)

Production
Kieslowski said that Red was the most difficult film of the trilogy to write: "I've got everything I need to put across what I want to say, which is really quite complicated. Therefore, if the idea I've got in mind doesn't come across, it meant that either film is too primitive a medium to support such a construction or that all of us put together haven't got enough talent for it". The main theme of the score, "Bolero", was written before any filming took place. According to the filmmakers, it was meant to symbolize events that occur repeatedly in people's lives.

Analysis
As in the previous two films, a single color dominates: numerous objects in the film are bright red, including the huge advertising banner featuring Valentine's facial profile. Several images recur throughout the film. Characters are often juxtaposed on different physical levels. The scenes between Valentine and Kern at his house never show the characters on the same level: Valentine either stands above him or sits below him. When Karin searches for Auguste, he hides on a walkway below her. During the climactic scene in the theater, Valentine stands on the stage, towering over Kern who is in the pit below. Telephone communication is important throughout, and so is broken glass (when Kern reveals his eavesdropping, his neighbors throw rocks through his windows, and at the end of the film Kern watches Valentine and Auguste on the news while watching the outside world through broken glass). Also, when Valentine is bowling, the camera moves down the line to where there sits a broken glass next to a packet of Marlboro cigarettes, which is the brand that Auguste smokes.

Biblical references relating to the Gospel of Matthew are also evident. The old man can be pictured as an Old Testament archetype, a God-like figure. Exploring biblical ideas in Red the questions of the judge being a 'God' figure is probably the one that has been explored most often. That he is as an Old Testament God, control over the wind and seas and predicts about people future. This film also depicts topics of the Philosophy of Law and the manner in which man acts in society, the relationship between the law, ethics and socially acceptable behavior and how not all of them coincide, particularly in the reflections by Judge Kern and some symbols related to Auguste.

Roger Ebert interpreted the film as an anti-romance, in parallel with Blue being an anti-tragedy and White being an anti-comedy.

Reception

Three Colors: Red received overwhelmingly positive reviews. It holds both a 100 out of 100 rating on Metacritic and a 100% approval rating on Rotten Tomatoes, based on 60 reviews, with an average rating of 8.70/10. Rotten Tomatoes' critical consensus reads: "A complex, stirring, and beautifully realized portrait of interconnected lives, Red is the captivating conclusion to a remarkable trilogy".

Film critic Geoff Andrew responded positively in Time Out London: "While Kieślowski dips into various interconnecting lives, the central drama is the electrifying encounter between Valentine—caring, troubled—and the judge, whose tendency to play God fails to match, initially, the girl's compassion. It's a film about destiny and chance, solitude and communication, cynicism and faith, doubt and desire; about lives affected by forces beyond rationalization. The assured direction avoids woolly mysticism by using material resources—actors, color, movement, composition, sound—to illuminate abstract concepts. Stunningly beautiful, powerfully scored and immaculately performed, the film is virtually flawless, and one of the very greatest cinematic achievements of the last few decades. A masterpiece". 

Film critic James Berardinelli of Reelviews also lauded the film, giving it four out of four stars. He described it as a "subtle" masterpiece, also praising the film's "satisfying exploration of such complex and diverse themes as destiny and platonic love". The film went on to become his 18th greatest film of all time. The trade magazine Variety was also enthusiastic about the film, highlighting the lead performances from Jacob and Trittingant. The British Film magazine Empire described the film as a "superb example of French arthouse which is also very watchable".

The film was included in the San Francisco Chronicle'''s "Hot 100 Films from the Past" in 1997.

 Year-end lists 
 1st – Desson Howe, The Washington Post 1st – Kevin Thomas, Los Angeles Times 2nd - Roger Ebert, Chicago Sun-Times Ebert included the entire Three Colors Trilogy in his list; later, when he wrote about it a separate essay for "Great Movies" section, he noticed that Red is "the best film among equals".
 2nd – Kenneth Turan, Los Angeles Times 4th – James Berardinelli, ReelViews 8th – Janet Maslin, The New York Times 8th – Robert Denerstein, Rocky Mountain News 9th – Scott Schuldt, The Oklahoman Top 10 (listed alphabetically, not ranked) – Matt Zoller Seitz, Dallas Observer Top 10 (not ranked) – Howie Movshovitz, The Denver PostSoundtrack

Awards and recognition
 Nominated for three Academy Awards:
 Best Director – Krzysztof Kieślowski
 Best Original Screenplay – Krzysztof Kieślowski and Krzysztof Piesiewicz
 Best Cinematography – Piotr Sobociński
 1996 BAFTA Awards:
 Best Director - Krzysztof Kieślowski (Nominated)
 Best Original Screenplay - Krzysztof Kieślowski and Krzysztof Piesiewicz (Nominated)
 Best Film Not in English Language - Martin Karmitz and Krzysztof Kieślowski (Nominated)
 Cannes Film Festival, Palme d'Or (nominated)
 National Board of Review, Best Foreign Language Film
 New York Film Critics Circle Awards, Best Foreign Language Film
 Bodil Awards, Best European Film
 National Society of Film Critics Awards, Best Foreign Language Film
 Los Angeles Film Critics Association Awards, Best Foreign Film
 French Syndicate of Cinema Critics Awards, Best French Film
 Zbigniew Preisner won the César Award for Best Music
 César Award nominations:
 Best Film
 Best Actor – Jean-Louis Trintignant
 Best Actress – Irène Jacob
 Best Director – Krzysztof Kieślowski
 Best Writing – Krzysztof Kieślowski and Krzysztof Piesiewicz
 Red was selected by The New York Times as one of "The Best 1,000 Movies Ever Made".
 In 2007, the film was ranked at No. 33 by The Guardian'''s readers poll on the list of "40 greatest foreign films of all time".

See also
 List of films with a 100% rating on Rotten Tomatoes, a film review aggregator website
 List of submissions to the 67th Academy Awards for Best Foreign Language Film
 List of Swiss submissions for the Academy Award for Best Foreign Language Film

References

External links

 
 
 
 
 Three Colors: A Hymn to European Cinema an essay by Colin MacCabe at the Criterion Collection
 Red: A Fraternity of Strangers an essay by Georgina Evans at the Criterion Collection
 Online Exhibition: On Location - Revisiting Trois Couleurs: Rouge at Roman's Lab

1994 films
French romantic drama films
Polish romantic drama films
Swiss romantic drama films
1990s French-language films
Films directed by Krzysztof Kieślowski
Films scored by Zbigniew Preisner
Films shot in Switzerland
Independent Spirit Award for Best Foreign Film winners
Adultery in films
Films about modeling
Films with screenplays by Krzysztof Piesiewicz
Films with screenplays by Krzysztof Kieślowski
Films produced by Marin Karmitz
French-language Swiss films
1990s French films
1994 independent films